Lester Atwell (July 31, 1908 – April 30, 2001) was a novelist, short-story writer and US veteran from Brooklyn. His most notable works include Private, Love is Just Around the Corner and Life with its Sorrow, Life with its Tear.

Military service
At the age of 34 Atwell was drafted in the Army to serve in World War II. As an infantryman in the 87th Infantry Division he was active in the European theater, and fought in Ardennes as part of the Battle of the Bulge.

Works
Atwell's 1958 book Private serves as his personal war diary, and recounts his service in World War II. The work has been described as being "as complete and accurate a picture of men in and awaiting combat as one is likely to find." The work was runner-up for the National Book Critics Circle Award in 1959 in the nonfiction category.

Atwell's Love is Just Around the Corner served as the basis for the Broadway musical Flora the Red Menace. His third book Life With Its Sorrow, Life With Its Tear was published in 1971, and his short stories have appeared in publications including The Saturday Evening Post and Collier's.

His last novel The Other Dear Charmer was written at the age of 82.

Death
Atwell died peacefully of natural causes at the age of 92 in Cary, North Carolina.

References

External links

1908 births
2001 deaths
United States Army personnel of World War II
American male novelists
Writers from Brooklyn
Fordham University alumni
Art Students League of New York alumni
American war novelists
American male short story writers
20th-century American novelists
20th-century American male writers
20th-century American short story writers
Novelists from New York (state)
United States Army soldiers